The Cathedral of St. Peter the Apostle in Cali  also called the Metropolitan Cathedral of Cali or simply the Cali Cathedral, is the mother church of the city of Cali, Colombia, and the seat of the Roman Catholic Archdiocese of Cali. It is recognized as Architectural Heritage of Cali, and was declared a National Monument of Colombia by resolution 002 of 12 March 1982.

Its construction began the Baroque style, designed by the architect Antonio García. On 1 September 1772, parish priest José Rivera laid the first stone. Prisoners of local prisons were used for labor for construction. In 1802 the church was finished except for the tower. Due to political problems, construction was not completed until 1841, following neoclassical lines.

See also
Catholic Church in Colombia

References

Roman Catholic cathedrals in Colombia
Buildings and structures in Cali
Baroque architecture in Colombia
Roman Catholic churches completed in 1841
Religious organizations established in 1841
19th-century Roman Catholic church buildings in Colombia